Jeremy Allen White (born February 17, 1991) is an American actor. He is best known for his long-running role as Phillip "Lip" Gallagher on the Showtime dramedy series Shameless (2011–2021). He has also appeared in the first season of the thriller series Homecoming (2018) and in several films including Afterschool, Twelve, After Everything, and The Rental. Since 2022, he has starred in the Hulu drama series The Bear, for which he received critical acclaim and won a Critics' Choice Television Award, a Golden Globe Award, and a Screen Actors Guild Award.

Early life
Prior to meeting each other, White's parents had both moved to New York City to pursue careers in acting. His mother Eloise is from North Carolina and has a BFA from Virginia Commonwealth University. After meeting, performing on stage together for several years, and marrying, the couple ended their acting careers and obtained jobs that would help them support their new family.

White grew up in Carroll Gardens, Brooklyn.

Throughout elementary school, White was a dancer, specifically ballet, jazz, and tap. At the age of 13, upon entering a new middle school dance program, he had a change of heart and decided to pursue acting. For high school, he went to the  Professional Performing Arts School. White got the job playing Phillip "Lip" Gallagher on Shameless right out of high school.

Personal life
White married actress Addison Timlin on October 18, 2019. The couple have two daughters (born in October 2018 and December 2020).

Filmography

Film

Television

Awards and nominations

References

External links

Living people
American male television actors
American male film actors
Best Musical or Comedy Actor Golden Globe (television) winners
People from Brooklyn
1991 births